The 2010–11 season of the Turkish Women's First Football League is the 15th season of Turkey's premier women's football league. Ataşehir Belediyespor is the champion of the season.

Teams

Season

Table

Results

Topscorers

External links
 Kadınlar 1. Ligi 2010 - 2011 Sezonu 

2010
2010–11 domestic women's association football leagues
Women's